Křížkový Újezdec is a municipality and village in Prague-East District in the Central Bohemian Region of the Czech Republic. It has about 300 inhabitants.

Administrative parts
The village of Čenětice is an administrative part of Křížkový Újezdec.

History
The first written mention of Křížkový Újezdec is from 1349.

Gallery

References

Villages in Prague-East District